Joseph Anthony "Amp" Fiddler is an American singer, songwriter, keyboardist, and record producer from Detroit, Michigan. His musical styles include funk, soul, dance and electronica music. He is probably best known for his contributions to the band Enchantment, and as part of George Clinton's Parliament and Funkadelic groups from 1985 until 1996. His first solo album  Waltz of a Ghetto Fly was released in March 2004. His most recent album, Amp Dog Knights, was released in 2017.

Early career
Fiddler has worked with George Clinton, Moodymann, Stephanie McKay, Jamiroquai, Prince, Was (Not Was), the Brand New Heavies, Fishbone, Corinne Bailey Rae and neo soul artist Maxwell. Working with his brother, Bubz (bass guitarist, producer and songwriter), he released the album With Respect in 1990 on Elektra, recording under the name Mr. Fiddler. Amp Fiddler is credited with introducing hip-hop producer J Dilla to the Akai MPC sampling drum machine and also to A Tribe Called Quest member Q-Tip, who introduced the young Dilla into the music industry world.

In regards to Dilla's memory, he said:

Discography

Albums
With Respect (1990)
Waltz of a Ghetto Fly (2004) - UK #82
Afro Strut (2006) - UK #126
Inspiration Information (2008) - with Sly and Robbie
Motor City Booty (2016)
Kindred Live (2017) - with Will Sessions
Amp Dog Knights (2017)
The One (2018) - with Will Sessions

Singles, Maxi-singles & EP's

"Basementality" (2002)	
"Love and War" (2003)	
"Possibilities" (2003)
"I Believe in You" (2003) - UK #72
"Dreamin" (2004) - UK #71
"Too High" (2004)
"If You Can't Get Me Off Your Mind" (2004)
"I Believe In You" (2004)
"Eye To Eye" (2004)
"Right Where You Are" (2006)
"Ridin' / Faith" (2006)
"Hope / Dope" (2006)
"If I Don't" (2007) -  featuring Corinne Bailey Rae
"Find My Way" (2007)
"Stay Or Move On" (2008)
"Inspiration Information" (2008) - with Sly and Robbie
"Blackhouse (Paint The White House Black)" (2008) - with Sly and Robbie
"Take it" (2014) featuring Raphael Saadiq
"Basementality 2" (2014)
"Bassmentality 3" (2015)
"Motor City Booty" (2016)
"So Sweet" (2017)
"Lost Without You" (2017) - with Will Sessions
"Reminiscin'" (2017) - with Will Sessions
"Rendezvous" (2017) - with Will Sessions
"Keep Coming" (2019)

References

External links

Amp Fiddler interview by Pete Lewis in Blues & Soul, October 2008
Amp Fiddler interview in Clubbity
Amp Fiddler interview by SoulRnB.com
Amp Fiddler lecture at Red Bull Music Academy
 interview by Andre J. Ellington for Rollingout.com

20th-century African-American male singers
21st-century African-American male  singers
African-American  male singer-songwriters
American funk keyboardists
American funk singers
American soul keyboardists
American soul singers
Living people
P-Funk members
Singers from Detroit
Year of birth missing (living people)
Singer-songwriters from Michigan